Chełmce may refer to the following places:
Chełmce, Greater Poland Voivodeship (west-central Poland)
Chełmce, Łódź Voivodeship (central Poland)
Chełmce, Świętokrzyskie Voivodeship (south-central Poland)